"Bem" is the second episode of the second season of the American animated science fiction television series Star Trek, the 18th episode overall. It first aired in the NBC Saturday morning lineup on 14 September 1974, and was written by David Gerrold, who wrote the earlier episode "More Tribbles, More Troubles" and worked on several Original Series episodes. This episode marks the first time that Captain James T. Kirk's full name is given, revealing that the middle initial stood for Tiberius, after the Roman emperor.

In this episode, the Enterprise crew must cope with a diplomatically sensitive issue involving a guest officer who meddles in a crucial mission.

Plot 

On stardate 7403.6, the Federation starship Enterprise crew is conducting a series of exploratory missions with honorary Commander Ari bn Bem, a representative from the newly contacted planet Pandro, who is working for his government as an independent observer of the Federation.

Bem accompanies a landing party on a mission to a newly discovered planet. Instead of observing, however, he begins to interfere with the mission.

Before long, Captain Kirk and his people are captured by primitive natives. They soon learn that these primitives are under the guardianship of a powerful noncorporeal entity who is upset that the Enterprise crew has come to her planet and interfered with her "children".

Production 
The writer of the episode, David Gerrold won both Hugo and Nebula awards for science fiction, and also wrote the episode "More Tribbles, More Troubles" for this series.
"Bem" began as a script for Star Trek: The Original Series third season, it was condensed for The Animated Series first season, and was finally produced during the show's second season.

Reception 
In 2017, Tor.com rated this episode 8 out of 10, noting that the Enterprise takes on the passenger Bem and goes to the planet Delta Theta III.

See also 
 "Justice" - a Next Generation episode in which the Enterprise encounters a primitive civilization watched over by an alien that the locals believe to be God.

References

External links 
 
 

 "Bem" at Curt Danhauser's Guide to the Animated Star Trek
 "Bem" Full episode for viewing at StarTrek.com

1974 American television episodes
Star Trek: The Animated Series episodes
Television episodes written by David Gerrold